The Audi DTM V8 engine family is a series of prototype, four-stroke, 3.6-liter to 4.0-liter, naturally aspirated V-8 racing engines, developed and produced by Audi for the Deutsche Tourenwagen Meisterschaft, between 1990 and 1992; and later the Deutsche Tourenwagen Masters, between 2000 and 2018.

Audi V8 DTM

Audi TT-R DTM
The Audi TT-R DTM uses a  Audi naturally-aspirated V8 engine in partnership with Neil Brown Engineering for development, building, assembly, maintenance and tune-up role, it has a power output of approximately  @ 6,800 rpm and a maximum torque of about  @ 6,000 rpm, while using two  air intake restrictors.

Audi A4 DTM

Audi A5/RS5 DTM

After the 2012 season, the vehicle was renamed RS5 DTM, corresponding with the Audi RS5 production model. It is powered by a naturally-aspirated engine and 2x DOHC camshafts. The engine itself is a custom-built Audi 4.0 L V8, with four valves per cylinder, and a 90-degree V-angle. Front engined and longitudinally mounted engine mounting layout, the RS5's engine is indirect fuel injected. The RS5 DTM's ECU is a Bosch Motronic MS 5.1 and other components such as the CDI ignition are also supplied by Bosch.

Applications
Audi V8 DTM
Abt-Audi TT-R DTM
Audi A4 DTM
Audi 5 Series DTM

References

Volkswagen Group
V8 engines
Audi engines
Volkswagen Group engines
Gasoline engines by model
Engines by model
Piston engines
Internal combustion engine